Goodbye, Dragon Inn is a 2003 Taiwanese comedy-drama slow cinema film written and directed by Tsai Ming-liang about a movie theater about to close down and its final screening of the 1967 wuxia film Dragon Inn.

Plot
During the last 90 minutes of a screening of Dragon Inn at an old Taipei cinema about to close down, the hobbled ticket woman tries to find the projectionist to give him a steamed bun. A Japanese tourist seeks a homosexual encounter; Chen Chao-jung brushes off his advance and tells him the place is haunted. Jun Shi, an actor in Dragon Inn, watches the film with tears in his eyes. Outside, he meets Miao Tien, who also acted in the film and attended the screening with his grandson.

Cast
Lee Kang-sheng as the projectionist
Chen Shiang-chyi as the ticket woman
Mitamura Kiyonobu as the Japanese tourist
Jun Shih as himself
Miao Tien as himself
Chen Chao-jung as himself
Yang Kuei-mei as the peanut-eating woman

Production
In his prior film, What Time is it There?, Tsai set a scene in the old Fu-Ho theater at the edge of Taipei. Reminded of the super-cinemas and the poetic King Hu films of his youth, he shot a scene in the theater and premiered the film there. After the premiere, Tsai approached the owner to shoot an entire film there, fearing the soon-to-close theater would be lost forever. What was envisioned as a long short soon turned into a feature due to the long takes.

Release
A 4K restoration was released on DVD and Blu-ray by Second Run on November 23, 2020, and digitally by Metrograph on December 18, 2020.

Reception
On review aggregator website Rotten Tomatoes, Goodbye, Dragon Inn has an approval rating of 80% based on 44 reviews, with an average rating of 7.30/10. The website's critical consensus reads, "Deliberately paced yet absorbing, Goodbye, Dragon Inn offers an affectionate—and refreshingly unique—look at a fading theater that should strike a chord with cineastes." A. O. Scott of The New York Times praised the film, writing, "Goodbye, Dragon Inn has a quiet, cumulative magic, whose source is hard to identify. Its simple, meticulously composed frames are full of mystery and feeling; it's an action movie that stands perfectly still." J. Hoberman of The Village Voice also liked the film: "And because Tsai is the director, Goodbye, Dragon Inn is also a movie of elegant understatement and considerable formal intelligence."

Tsai considers it one of his best films and chose it as one of his entries of the 10 greatest films of all time in the 2012 Sight & Sound Directors' Poll. Directors Monte Hellman and Apichatpong Weerasethakul also voted for it in that poll. On November 6, 2020, Weerasethakul tweeted, "THE best film of the last 125 years: Goodbye, Dragon Inn." The film won several awards, including the FIPRESCI Prize at the 60th Venice International Film Festival and the Best Feature Gold Plaque at the Chicago International Film Festival.

References

External links

2003 films
2003 comedy-drama films
Films directed by Tsai Ming-liang
Films set in a movie theatre
2000s Mandarin-language films
Films with screenplays by Tsai Ming-liang
Taiwanese comedy-drama films
Taiwanese LGBT-related films
2003 comedy films
2003 drama films